Clifford Bricker (23 April 1904 – 20 September 1980) was a Canadian long-distance runner who competed in the 1928 and 1932 Summer Olympics. In 1927 he set the amateur world record for 15 miles.

Career

Bricker ran his first marathon in Boston in 1927, clocking 3:00:54 and finishing fourth, more than 20 minutes behind the winner, Clarence DeMar.
The following month he won the Buffalo Marathon in 2:40:05, defeating DeMar and setting a Canadian amateur record. On 1 July 1927, he broke the amateur world record for 15 miles (24.14 km) in Toronto, running 1:19:11. Bricker left early for the 1928 Olympics in Amsterdam so he could acclimatize; he was one of Canada's leading Olympic hopes, and DeMar stated he considered Bricker the favorite for the Olympic marathon. He only finished tenth, but his time of 2:39:24 was still his personal best and another Canadian record.

Bricker broke the Canadian record for 10,000 metres at the 1932 Canadian Olympic trials, running 31:42.0. At the 1932 Olympics in Los Angeles he placed eighth in the 10,000 metres and twelfth in the marathon.

References

External links
 

1904 births
1980 deaths
Track and field athletes from Ontario
Canadian male long-distance runners
Athletes (track and field) at the 1928 Summer Olympics
Athletes (track and field) at the 1932 Summer Olympics
Olympic track and field athletes of Canada